The discography of Westminster Cathedral Choir includes many award-winning recordings, among them the 1998 Gramophone Award Record of the Year for Frank Martin's Mass for Double Choir and Ildebrando Pizzetti's Requiem.

Discography

George Malcolm (musician) 
Victoria: Tenebrae Responsories.

Stephen Cleobury
 Gregorian Chant from Westminster Cathedral

David Hill
Britten: A Ceremony of Carols
Palestrina: Missa Papae Marcelli & Missa brevis (CDA66266)
Praetorius: Christmas Music' (CDH55446) with The Parley of Instruments 
Tomas Luis de Victoria: Ave maris stella & O quam gloriosum' (CDA66114)
Victoria: Missa Vidi speciosam & other sacred music' (CDH55358)
Victoria: O magnum mysterium & Ascendens Christus in altum' (CDA66190)
Victoria: Requiem (CDA66250)
Victoria: Tenebrae Responsories (CDA66304)

James O'Donnell (organist)
 Adeste fideles, carols including "Adeste fideles" (O come, all ye faithful) by John Francis Wade (CDA66668) 
 Anerio: Requiem (CDH55213)
 Dupré, Louis Vierne & Widor: Choral Music 
 Duruflé: Requiem & Messe cum jubilo (CDA66757)
 Exultate Deo (CDA66850)
 Francisco Guerrero:
 Missa De la batalla escoutez & other works with His Majesty's Sagbutts & Cornetts
 Missa Sancta et immaculata & other sacred music' (CDH55313)
 Janáček & Kodály: Masses (CDA67147)
 Josquin: Missa Pange lingua & other works (CDH55374)
 Lassus: Missa Bell' Amfitrit' altera (CDA66688) with His Majestys Sagbutts & Cornetts
 Frank Martin: Mass for Double Choir; Pizzetti: Messa di Requiem (CDA67017)
 Masterpieces of Mexican Polyphony (CDH55317)
 Masterpieces of Portuguese Polyphony (CDH55229)
 Cristóbal de Morales: Missa Queramus cum pastoribus & other sacred music (CDH55276)
 Mortuus est Philippus Rex including Missa Philippus Rex Hispaniae by Bartolomé de Escobedo  (CDH55248)
 Palestrina:
 Missa Aeterna Christi munera & other sacred music (CDH55368)
 Missa De beata virgine & Missa Ave Maria (CDH55420)
 Missa Ecce ego Johannes & other sacred music (CDH55407)
 Missa O rex gloriae & Missa Viri Galilaei (CDH55335)
Panis angelicus - motets by Mendelssohn, Rossini and others (CDA66669)
 Francisco de Peñalosa: Masses (CDH55326)
 Poulenc: Mass & Motets  (CDH55448)
 Stravinsky: Mass & Symphony of Psalms (CDA66437) with City of London Sinfonia
 Victoria:
 Missad dum complerentur & other sacred music (CDH55452)
 Missa trahe me post te & other sacred music (CDH55376)

Martin Baker
Byrd: The three Masses (CDA68038)   
Palestrina: Missa Hodie Christus natus est & other sacred music (CDH55367)  
Bingham & Vaughan Williams: Mass (CDA67503)
Brahms & Rheinberger: Mass  (CDA67559)
Christmas Vespers at Westminster Cathedral (CDA67522)
From the vaults of Westminster Cathedral (CDA67707)
Langlais: Missa Salve regina & Messe solennelle (CDH55444)
Alonso Lobo: Lamentations & other sacred music (CDA68106)
MacMillan: Mass & other sacred music (CDA67219)
MacMillan: Tenebrae Responsories & other choral works (CDA67970)
Maxwell Davies: Mass & other choral works (CDA67454)
Miserere - including Miserere mei, Deus by George Malcolm (1917-1997) (CDA67938)
Palestrina: Lamentations (CDA67610)
Palestrina: Missa Dum complerentur & other music for Whitsuntide (CDH55449)
Palestrina: Missa Tu es Petrus & Missa Te Deum laudamus (CDA67785)
Victoria: Ave regina caelorum & other sacred music  (SACDA67479)
Victoria: Missa De Beata Maria Virgine & Missa Surge propera' (CDA67891)
Sheppard: Media vita & other sacred music (CDA68187)

References

Discographies of British artists